The Greek Basketball Cup or Hellenic Basketball Cup (also stylized as Basket Cup; Greek: Κύπελλο Ελλάδος καλαθοσφαίρισης ανδρών) is the top-tier level annual professional basketball national cup competition in Greece. It is organized by the Hellenic Basketball Federation (E.O.K.).

History and format
There were no official nation-wide Greek Cup competitions prior to the 1975–76 season. However, there was a precursor tournament to the Greek Cup, called the Attica State Cup, which was won by AEK, in the 1966–67 and 1970–71 seasons. The first official Greek Cup took place during the 1975–76 season.

From the 1994–95 to 2003–04 seasons, the Final Four format was used. The competition format currently includes a total of 62 teams; 14 from the top-tier level Greek Basket League, 16 from the 2nd-tier level Greek A2 Basket League, and 32 teams from the third-tier level Greek B Basket League.

The top six placed teams from the previous season of the Greek Basket League have an automatic bye to the quarterfinals, while the other eight teams play in preliminary rounds for the other two quarterfinals places. The quarterfinals and onward rounds are played under a single elimination format.

Cup winners 

 1975–76:  Olympiacos
 1976–77:  Olympiacos
 1977–78:  Olympiacos
 1978–79:  Panathinaikos
 1979–80:  Olympiacos
 1980–81:  AEK
 1981–82:  Panathinaikos
 1982–83:  Panathinaikos
 1983–84:  PAOK
 1984–85:  Aris
 1985–86:  Panathinaikos
 1986–87:  Aris
 1987–88:  Aris
 1988–89:  Aris
 1989–90:  Aris
 1990–91:  Panionios
 1991–92:  Aris
 1992–93:  Panathinaikos
 1993–94:  Olympiacos
 1994–95:  PAOK Bravo
 1995–96:  Panathinaikos
 1996–97:  Olympiacos
 1997–98:  Aris Moda Bagno
 1998–99:  PAOK
 1999–00:  AEK
 2000–01:  AEK
 2001–02:  Olympiacos
 2002–03:  Panathinaikos
 2003–04:  Aris
 2004–05:  Panathinaikos
 2005–06:  Panathinaikos
 2006–07:  Panathinaikos
 2007–08:  Panathinaikos
 2008–09:  Panathinaikos
 2009–10:  Olympiacos
 2010–11:  Olympiacos
 2011–12:  Panathinaikos
 2012–13:  Panathinaikos
 2013–14:  Panathinaikos
 2014–15:  Panathinaikos
 2015–16:  Panathinaikos
 2016–17:  Panathinaikos
 2017–18:  AEK
 2018–19:  Panathinaikos
 2019–20:  AEK
 2020–21:  Panathinaikos
 2021–22:  Olympiacos
 2022–23:  Olympiacos

Finals

Titles by club

Titles by city 
6 clubs have won the Greek Basketball Cup. The 6 clubs that have won the Greek Basketball Cup all come from either the Thessaloniki or Athens urban areas, which are the two largest urban areas in the country of Greece.

Final Four (1994–2004 & 2021–present)
The Final Four system was introduced in the 1994–95 season, and it was used until the 2003–04 season. It was used again in 2021–22 season, but without a 3rd place game.

Final 4 performance by club

Greek Basketball Cup Finals game top scorers and MVPs  

Since the first Greek Cup in 1976, the Top Scorer of the Greek Cup Finals is given an award, regardless of whether he plays on the winning or losing team. Since 1995, an MVP is also named at the conclusion of the finals.

All-time Greek Cup Finals game career scoring leaders

(Through the 2020 Greek Basketball Cup):
 Players that are still active are marked in bold.

Players with the most appearances in the Greek Cup Finals

(Through the 2020 Greek Basketball Cup):
 Players that are still active are marked in bold.

Players with the most Greek Cup titles
(Through the 2020 Greek Basketball Cup):
 Players that are still active are marked in bold.

Head coaches with multiple Greek Cup titles

(Through the 2023 Greek Basketball Cup):
 Head coaches that are still active are marked in bold.

All the official finals by decade

1970s

1980s

1990s

2000s

2010s

2020s

See also 
Greek Basket League
Greek A2 Basket League
HEBA Greek All-Star Game
Hellenic Basketball Federation (E.O.K.)
Hellenic Basketball Association (HEBA)

References

External links 
 Official Hellenic Basketball Federation Site 
  
 Official English website 

 
Basketball cup competitions in Europe
Basketball cup competitions in Greece